Oscar Pozzi (born 27 December 1971 in Lecco) is a former Italian racing cyclist. He rode in 9 Grand Tours.

Major results

1992
3rd Giro del Canavese
1994
2nd Giro d'Abruzzo
1995
3rd Gran Premio Capodarco
1996
1st Gran Premio Industria e Commercio Artigianato Carnaghese
2nd Giro d'Abruzzo
1st stage 4
1998
10th Grand Prix de Plouay
1999
2nd Gran Premio Industria e Commercio Artigianato Carnaghese
2000
4th Coppa Ugo Agostoni

References

1971 births
Living people
Italian male cyclists
Sportspeople from Lecco
Cyclists from the Province of Lecco